Frank William Mossfield  (born 4 June 1935) is a former Australian politician who was an Australian Labor Party member of the Australian House of Representatives from March 1996 to October 2004, representing the Division of Greenway, New South Wales. He was born in Sydney, New South Wales, and was a fitter and turner before entering politics. He was the New South Wales State Secretary of the Australian Society of Engineers and later the Greater New South Wales Branch Secretary of the Australian Workers' Union, an Executive Member of the Australian Council of Trade Unions and President of the Labor Council of New South Wales. He was appointed a Member of the Order of Australia in 1995. He retired at the 2004 election.

References

1935 births
Living people
Politicians from Sydney
Australian Labor Party members of the Parliament of Australia
Labor Right politicians
Members of the Australian House of Representatives for Greenway
Members of the Order of Australia
21st-century Australian politicians
20th-century Australian politicians